() is a museum in Sengokuhara, Hakone, Kanagawa Prefecture, Japan.  The museums is dedicated to the character in the story The Little Prince by Antoine de Saint-Exupéry.

References

External links

 

The Little Prince
Antoine de Saint-Exupéry
Buildings and structures in Hakone, Kanagawa
Biographical museums in Japan
Literary museums in Japan
Museums in Kanagawa Prefecture
Tokyo Broadcasting System